Kurinbi (Dhivehi: ކުރިނބީ) is one of the inhabited islands of Haa Dhaalu Atoll administrative division and geographically part of Thiladhummathi Atoll in the north of the Maldives.

History
The island was severely damaged by the great cyclone of 1821 that hit the northern atolls of the Maldives.

Geography

Demography

References

External links
 Images gallery 

Islands of the Maldives